Brenner is an unincorporated community in Doniphan County, Kansas, United States.

History
Brenner was established in 1872 when the Atchison & Nebraska Railroad was extended to that point.

The first post office at Brenner opened in 1871, closed temporarily in April, 1912, reopened in June, 1912, and reclosed permanently in 1917.

References

Further reading

External links
 Doniphan County maps: Current, Historic, KDOT

Unincorporated communities in Doniphan County, Kansas
Unincorporated communities in Kansas
1872 establishments in Kansas
Populated places established in 1872